Only Seconds is an EP album by the indie rock group Northern Room, released on April 26, 2007. All vocals are sung by Andrew Jonathan.

Track listing

External links
 Official Website
 Northern Room at MySpace
 Northern Room at Last.fm

Northern Room albums
2007 EPs